Leonid Spiridonov (born December 16, 1980 in Kerdyom) is a male freestyle wrestler from Kazakhstan. He participated in Men's freestyle 66 kg at 2008 Summer Olympics. He lost bronze medal fight against Sushil Kumar from India and was ranked on 4-5th place.

At Men's freestyle 66 kg at 2004 Summer Olympics he was ranked on 4th place as well.

He also pariticpated in 2006 Asian Games.

External links
 Wrestler profile on beijing2008.com

Living people
1980 births
Wrestlers at the 2008 Summer Olympics
Wrestlers at the 2004 Summer Olympics
Olympic wrestlers of Kazakhstan
Kazakhstani male sport wrestlers
People from Yakutsk
Asian Games medalists in wrestling
Wrestlers at the 2006 Asian Games
Wrestlers at the 2010 Asian Games
World Wrestling Championships medalists
Asian Games bronze medalists for Kazakhstan

Medalists at the 2010 Asian Games
20th-century Kazakhstani people
21st-century Kazakhstani people